Crespithrips is a genus of thrips in the family Phlaeothripidae, which was first described by Laurence Alfred Mound and David C. Morris in 2000. The type species is Crespithrips enigmaticus.

Species of the genus are found in Queensland, the Northern Territory and Western Australia.

Species
 Crespithrips enigmaticus
 Crespithrips hesperus

References

Phlaeothripidae
Thrips
Thrips genera
Insects described in 2000
Taxa named by Laurence Alfred Mound